Companies and Intellectual Property Authority (CIPA) is Botswana's registrar of companies and is a government parastatal. It falls under the Ministry of Trade and Industry. All forms of companies (as permitted by Botswana Companies and Intellectual Property Authority Act) are incorporated and registered with CIPA and file specific details as required by the current Companies and Intellectual Property Authority Act. All registered limited companies, including subsidiary, small and inactive companies, must file annual financial statements in addition to annual company returns. Registering of companies is now done online since the introduction of online business registration system launched by Bogolo Kenewendo .

Types of companies 
There are many different types of companies, including:

 Private Company
 Public Company
 Close Company
 Company Limited by Guarantee

See also 

 Air Botswana
 Bogolo Kenewendo
 The Voice Botswana
Botswana Unified Revenue Service

References

External links 

 Official website

Registrars of companies
Government agencies of Botswana